Operation Allied Protector was an anti-piracy military operation undertaken by NATO forces from March – August 2009 in the Gulf of Aden, the Indian Ocean, and the Guardafui Channel to protect maritime routes from pirates within the International Recommended Transit Corridor (IRTC). It was the second NATO anti-piracy operation in area following Operation Allied Provider and was succeeded by Operation Ocean Shield.

From 24 March – June 2009, the operation was conducted by Standing NATO Maritime Group One (SNMG1). This was the first time that SNMG1, which had previously operated in the Eastern Atlantic, was deployed to Southeast Asia. From 29 June – August 2009, Standing NATO Maritime Group Two (SNMG2) took over responsibility from SNMG1.

Operations
On 16 March 2009, SNMG1 departed from Souda Bay for the Gulf of Aden.

On 28 March 2009,  received a piracy emergency call from Grandezza, a  Maldivian-flagged yacht in the Gulf of Aden. The vessel reported that it was under machine gun and rocket-propelled grenade attack from at least one pirate skiff.  Two Sikorsky SH-60 Seahawk helicopters were scrambled from Halyburton and disrupted the attack. Due to the distance from the incident, the pirates were able to retreat before NATO surface forces arrived.  later debriefed the crew of Grandezza and obtained statements and photographs from the attack.

On 18 April 2009, at approximately 3:00 pm local time,  stopped an attempted pirate attack of the Norwegian oil tanker MV Front Ardenne. Seven pirates were ultimately detained after a several hour pursuit involving , USS Halyburton, and Wave Knight.  According to NATO, the suspects were "interrogated, disarmed,...[and]were set free according to national regulations."

From 26–27 April 2009, SNMG1 made a port call in Karachi, Pakistan.  Due to an increased amount of pirate activity, two other port visits in Singapore and Australia were cancelled. Furthermore, the end of SNMG1's participation in the operation was brought forward from June to May.

On 1 May 2009,  intervened in an attempted pirate attack of the Norwegian oil tanker MV Kition. The sole pirate skiff retreated to a dhow mothership, which was later intercepted by NATO surface forces. Eight Portuguese marines boarded the craft and detained 19 suspects and recovered several weapons, including several high-explosives.  According to Côrte-Reals commander, this was the first time that such weapons were recovered from a pirate vessel.

On 24 May 2009, a Canadian frigate boarded two pirate skiffs off the coast of Somalia, resulting in seizure of equipment, arms, and ammunition.

Deployed units
The following units were deployed in Operation Allied Protector:

Standing NATO Maritime Group One

Standing NATO Maritime Group Two

References

Notes

Piracy in Somalia
Anti-piracy